The 2017–18 Eastern Michigan Eagles men's basketball team represented Eastern Michigan University during the 2017–18 NCAA Division I men's basketball season. The Eagles, led by seventh-year head coach Rob Murphy, played their home games at the Convocation Center in Ypsilanti, Michigan as members of the West Division of the Mid-American Conference. They finished the season 22–13, 11–7 in MAC play to finish in second place in the West Division. They defeated Akron in the quarterfinals of the MAC tournament before losing in the semifinals to Toledo. They were invited to the CollegeInsider.com Tournament where they defeated Niagara in the first round before losing in the second round to Sam Houston State.

Previous season
They finished the 2016–17 regular season 15–16, 7–11 in MAC play to finish in a tie for eighth place. Due to tiebreaking rules, they received the No. 8 seed in the MAC tournament. They beat Northern Illinois in the opening round of the MAC Tournament but ultimately lost to the No. 1 seed Akron Zips in the quarterfinals.

Offseason

Departures

Incoming transfers

Preseason 
In the MAC preseason poll, the Eagles were picked to finish in fourth place in the MAC West Division.

Roster

Accolades
MAC West Division Preseason All-MAC Team
 James Thompson IV

Hoosier Tipoff Classic All-Tournament Team
 Elijah Minnie

MAC West Division Player of the Week
 James Thompson IV (Dec. 18)

Schedule and results

|-
!colspan=9 style=| Non-conference regular season

|-
!colspan=9 style=| MAC regular season

|-
!colspan=9 style=| MAC Tournament

|-
!colspan=9 style=| CIT

Game notes

Spring Arbor 
 Education Day
 Game in memory of Mike Radomski
 First game in NCAA Division I 2017–18 basketball season

UofM Dearborn 
 James Thompson IV moved into 2nd place on Eastern Michigan's all-time list for double-doubles with 41.

Arkansas State 
 James Thompson IV eclipsed the career 1,000-point mark
 James Thompson IV moves into 8th place on Eastern Michigan's all-time list for rebounds

Oakland 
 First time since 1985 that Eastern had three players score 20-or-more points in a single game against a Division I opponent (Jackson, Minnie, Thompson IV)

Central State 
 Family Day

See also
 2016–17 Eastern Michigan Eagles women's basketball team

References

Eastern Michigan Eagles men's basketball seasons
Eastern Michigan
Eastern Michigan Eagles men's basketball
Eastern Michigan Eagles men's basketball
Eastern Michigan